The Kolkata Leather Complex is an industrial complex at Karaidanga, Bantala near East Kolkata, India. It is located 20 km from the central business district of Kolkata and has an area of about 4.5 square kilometres. 

The complex is intended to serve as a central leather-tanning business for Kolkata. Bantala has approximately 500 tanneries and the Kolkata one performs 22-25% of all the tanning in India. The state of West Bengal is responsible for about 55% of India's leather exports. As of 2009, about 200 tanneries were relocated to the Calcutta Leather Complex.

The project includes a police station and a fire station; in 2017 the police station was brought under the jurisdiction of the Kolkata police. The facility also houses the Government College of Engineering and Leather Technology, which is affiliated with Maulana Abul Kalam Azad University of Technology, Kolkata. A  portion was designated as an IT park.

Pumping stations carry the effluent from the tanneries to a Common Effluent Treatment Plant (CETP). Problems in completing the common effluent treatment plant have caused serious difficulties, with toxic waste polluting the construction activities of some companies.

The complex was conceived in the early 1990s as "an integrated complex housing all activities relating to the leather industry in a modern and environment-friendly manner". The need for the project became evident when the Supreme Court of India ordered that all tanning activities in Kolkata be moved outside the city limits.

As of 2013, the complex was still not fully operational, and many illegal tanneries continued to operate outside the complex.

On February 2023, a data came out about new and existing investments in this industrial complex. Kolkata Leather Complex to get 10000 crore new investment which currently has an investment worth of 30000 crore. The proposed expansion would make it South Asia's Largest Integrated Leather Complex.

References

Buildings and structures in Kolkata
Indian leather industry